Cross-country skiing at the 2002 Winter Paralympics consisted of 32 events, 20 for men and 12 for women.

Medal table

Medal summary 
The competition events were:
2.5 km: - women
5 km: men - women
10 km: men - women
15 km: men - women
20 km: men
1x2.5/2x5 km relay: men - women
3x2.5 km relay: - women

Each event had separate standing, sitting, or visually impaired classifications:

LW2 - standing: single leg amputation above the knee
LW3 - standing: double leg amputation below the knee, mild cerebral palsy, or equivalent impairment
LW4 - standing: single leg amputation below the knee
LW5/7 - standing: double arm amputation
LW6/8 - standing: single arm amputation
LW9 - standing: amputation or equivalent impairment of one arm and one leg
LW 10 - sitting: paraplegia with no or some upper abdominal function and no functional sitting balance
LW 11 - sitting: paraplegia with fair functional sitting balance
LW 12 - sitting: double leg amputation above the knees, or paraplegia with some leg function and good sitting balance
B1 - visually impaired: no functional vision
B2 - visually impaired: up to ca 3-5% functional vision
B3 - visually impaired: under 10% functional vision

Men's events

Women's events

See also
Cross-country skiing at the 2002 Winter Olympics

References 

 

 
 Historical Medallists : Vancouver 2010 Winter Paralympics, Official website of the 2010 Winter Paralympics
 Winter Sport Classification, Canadian Paralympic Committee
Paralympics - Cross country: Men's relay results, Deseret News, March 14, 2002
Paralympics - Cross country: Short distance results, Deseret News, March 11, 2002
Paralympics - Cross country - Middle-distance events, Deseret News, March 13, 2002
Paralympic cross country times - Saturday's long-distance events at Soldier Hollow, Deseret News, March 13, 2002

2002 Winter Paralympics events
2002
Paralympics